The 1915–16 season was the 42nd season of competitive football played by Rangers.

Overview
Rangers played a total of 42 competitive matches during the 1915–16 season. They finished second in the Scottish League after winning 25 of the 38 league matches and collecting a total of 56 points (11 behind league winners Celtic).

The Scottish Cup was not competed for this season as the Scottish Football Association had withdrawn the tournament due to the outbreak of the First World War.

Results
All results are written with Rangers' score first.

Scottish League Division One

Appearances

See also
 1915–16 in Scottish football

References

Rangers F.C. seasons
Rangers